The 1956 United States presidential election in Wyoming took place on November 6, 1956, as part of the 1956 United States presidential election. State voters chose three representatives, or electors, to the Electoral College, who voted for president and vice president.

Wyoming was won by incumbent President Dwight D. Eisenhower (R–Pennsylvania), running with Vice President Richard Nixon, with 60.08 percent of the popular vote, against Adlai Stevenson (D–Illinois), running with Senator Estes Kefauver, with 39.92 percent of the popular vote.

Results

Results by county

See also
 United States presidential elections in Wyoming

References

Wyoming
1956
1956 Wyoming elections